Blue veil may refer to:

Blue veil, symbol of women's piety, sacrifice and observance, see Daughters of Divine Love

Paintings
The Blue Veil (Ingres), 1821 religious work, by French Neoclassical painter Jean-Auguste-Dominique Ingres
The Blue Veil (Tarbell), 1898 work by American Impressionist painter Edmund C. Tarbell
Blue Veil (Scobel), 2003–04 work by American painter Jenny Scobel

Film and television
The Blue Veil (1941 film), Czech drama
The Blue Veil (1942 film), French drama
The Blue Veil (1951 film), American adaptation of French drama
"The Blue Veil", 1960 episode of British secret agent TV series, Danger Man

Literature
The Blue Veil or The Crime of the Tower, 1885 novel by French author Fortuné du Boisgobey
Blue Veil (novel), 1961 adventure novel by Trevor Maine, one of the pen names Arthur Catherall

Music
"Blue Veil", 2010 musical meditation by John Zorn; on Nova Express (album)
"Blue Veil", rock band from Patras, Greece, formed in 2009. Their debut album "6 Degrees of Separation" was released in October 2017.

See also
Blue Veils and Golden Sands, 2002 BBC radio play